Boris Alexandrovich Yeflov (born 31 December 1926, Village Selishche, Rayon Borisoglebsky, Oblast Yaroslavl – died 17 March 2013, Kostroma) – Soviet/Russian painter, drawing artist, and master of rural landscape.

Biography

Family
Boris Alexandrovich Yeflov  was born on 31 December 1926 in Selishche village, Borisoglebsky Rayon, Yaroslavl Oblast, not far from the deployment of the military unit where his father was serving in the army. His father Yeflov Aleksandr Grigorievich was a career army officer and his mother Kolchina Klavdiya Vasilyevna was born into a well-off peasant family. When quite young, Boris was left without his father, who was arrested and executed by shooting in 1938, however posthumously rehabilitated in the subsequent years. For this reason, the family was forced to move to their friends’ home in Kostroma.

As a child, Boris took a great interest in drawing, making copies and imitating classical works of famous painters. Because of the dire need and poverty of the family Boris volunteered to join the army although he was not even seventeen.

Army
After a short military schooling, Boris was ordered to the operating units of the Black Sea Fleet. He served aboard the Krasny Krym guards cruiser, and in the ensuing years through to his discharge, aboard the destroyer Ognevoi as a gun layer. In the course of the infrequent leaves he attended drawing courses at an art studio in Sevastopol. The preserved drawings of that time were exhibited at various thematic exhibitions.

Kostroma
When he came back home, in 1951, he started to work at Kostroma Puppet Theater as a scene-painter. In 1952 Boris Yeflov entered marriage with Anisimova (Yeflova) Valentina Alexandrovna, who gave birth to two sons Vladimir (1955) and Aleksandr (1959). 1953 to 1958 he studied at Kostroma Art School. Afterwards through to his retirement, he worked in the studios of the Art Foundation of the Russian Federation. 

Being a painter by both vocation and profession, Boris would always love to spend some time to paint en plain air. Inspired by the tranquility and beauty of the Russian countryside, he drew multitudes of sketches turning them later in the silence of his studio into the unique paintings rich in colour and profound meaning such as Indian Summer, Leaf Fall, By the River, by the River… 

His trips to the small town Kirillov in Vologda Oblast gave rise to a series of the most famous water-colours of the painter including Corner Tower, The Road to Church, The Holy Gates, etc. 

During his visit to Severomorsk, Boris was inspired by the unforgettable austere beauty of the northern nature. This magical attraction of the North brought him later to Karelia. It was the first of his numerous tours to this land. Gaining great satisfaction from these landscapes, he produced several of his best and monumental paintings, which he called Karelia and Karelian Stones. 

As of 1957, he participated in numerous exhibitions, most of which were one-man shows. He died on 17 March 2013 at the age of 86 in Kostroma. Boris Yeflov was interred in the Ilyinskoye village not far from Kostroma.

Gallery

Exhibitions 
From 1958 now on Boris Yeflov’s works have been exhibited at dozens of exhibitions. Over recent years, almost all these exhibitions were one-man show. The most significant of them are listed below: 
 The art exhibition of Russian painters. Italy. Firm Sytko (1992)
 ‘The Transparent Light of the Water-Colour.’ Kostroma, Perpetuum Art Gallery (2006)
 Anniversary exhibition in honour of the Painter’s eightieth birthday. Kostroma. Romanov Museum (2007)
 ‘Farewell to the Painter.’ Exhibition at the Exhibition Hall in Kostroma City Administration building (2013)
 Exhibition of graphic portraits and drawings. Kostroma Synagogue (2014)
 ‘The Forest Road’. Kostroma Regional Museum of Nature (2016)
 ‘Varvara’s House’. The exhibition dedicated to the Painter’s ninetieth anniversary. Kostroma. Former Nobility Assembly Hall (2017)
 ‘The Magic of the North through the eyes of Boris Yeflov’. Karelia. Sortavala (2017)
 ‘Dance of Reflections’ Museum Kierikkikeskus, Oulu, Finland. (2021)

Literary sources
 Прозрачный свет акварели. Ефлов Борис Александрович. – Кострома: Издательский Дом «Линия График Кострома», 2007. – 34 с.
 Виртуоз пейзажа. Борис Ефлов. Живопись. – Кострома: Издательский Дом «Линия График Кострома», 2007. - 80 с: ил.
 О друзьях-товарищах. Борис Ефлов. – Ярославль: Издательское бюро «Филигрань», 2015. - 44 с.
 Варварин дом Бориса Ефлова. – Кострома: Издательский Дом «Линия График Кострома», 2017. - 56 с: ил.
 Магия севера глазами Бориса Ефлова. – Кострома: Издательский Дом «Линия График Кострома», 2017. - 80 с.: ил.
 Бузин А.И. Художники-фронтовики 1941 – 1945 г. – Кострома: Типография издательства «Северная правда», 1975. – 68 с.
 Художники Костромы. – Кострома: Издание Костромской организации художников, 1994. – 128 с.
 Костромские художники – ветераны войны и труда. – Кострома: Издание Костромской организации художников и администрации Костромской области, 1995. – 296 с.
 Бузин А.И., Касторская Т.М., Туловская Т.И., Неганова Г.Д. Художники земли Костромской. – Кострома: Костромаиздат, 2013. – 376 с.: ил.
 Бузин А.И. Великая Отечественная война в творчестве костромских художников. – Кострома: Костромаиздат. – 2015. – 120 с.
 ХУДОЖНИКИ НАРОДОВ СССР, Библиографический словарь., том. 4, кн. 1, стр. 75, Москва, «Искусство», 1983. – 592 с.
 Arte soviético. Realismo socialista 1945-1980 (Catálogo Exposición Galería Ynguanzo, Octubre-Noviemb). – Romano Canavese: Tipografia Ferrero, 1991. – 19-21 p.

External links
 Exhibition of graduation sketches of graduates of the Kostroma Art School
 «Transparent light of watercolor»
 The Memory of the Heart exhibition of local painters has opened in Kostroma
 The Haystack exhibition by Boris Eflov has opened in Kostroma
 Boris Yeflov’s painting
 Boris Yeflov. The Varvara’s House
 The art exhibition has opened in the Kostroma synagogue
 Alone with the pictures
 Opening of the exhibition of Boris Yeflov’s paintings
 Kostroma front-linepainters. Materials for the exhibition of works by Kostroma painters, participants of the Great Patriotic War

Soviet painters
Russian painters
1926 births
2013 deaths